The 2013 Glava Tour of Norway was the third edition of the Glava Tour of Norway road cycling race.  It was held over a period of five days between 15 and 19 May 2013.  The race was a part of the 2013 UCI Europe Tour with a race classification of 2.1.  Top Norwegian cyclists competing in the race included Edvald Boasson Hagen, Lars Petter Nordhaug, and Alexander Kristoff, with the notable exception of Thor Hushovd, who raced in the 2013 Tour of California instead.

Edvald Boasson Hagen won the race overall as well as the Nordialog super sprint classification. Portuguese rider Sérgio Paulinho came in second overall. Norwegian Sondre Holst Enger took third place as well as the Škoda young riders classification (U26).

Schedule

Teams
Twenty teams were invited to compete in the 2013 Glava Tour of Norway: 5 teams from the UCI ProTeams, 7 UCI Professional Continental Teams and 8 UCI Continental Teams.

Stages

Stage 1
15 May 2013 – Fredrikstad to Sarpsborg, 

The ride then took a mostly-flat clockwise route through Østfold and finished with three laps in Sarpsborg city center. Alexander Kristoff beat fellow Norwegian national rider Edvald Boasson Hagen in a sprint finish, and French rider Sébastien Hinault took third. Spanish rider Amets Txurruka won the King of the Mountains title for the climb up to Fredriksten Fortress, Italian Kristian Sbaragli took the young riders classification, and Alexander Kristoff earned the sprinting title in addition to his stage win.

Stage 2
16 May 2013 – Kongsberg to Skien, 

The second stage began with the riders going west from Kongsberg until they reached Gransherad, northwest of Notodden, at which point they turned southeast towards Skien to complete the final three laps in town. Alexander Kristoff once again beat Edvald Boasson Hagen on the final sprint, maintaining his sprint and overall lead, and fellow Norwegian Sondre Holst Enger took third in the stage as well as the young riders classification. Belgian rider Sander Cordeel was first on both mountain sections of the race and took the King of the Mountains classification.

Stage 3
17 May 2013 – Tønsberg to Drammen, 

The third stage was a twisty ride north along the Oslofjord from Tønsberg to Drammen, finishing with five final circuits in the city. The race was on the same day as Norwegian Constitution Day, so there was a large turnout of spectators in traditional Norwegian bunader. Because of the cancelled laps the previous day, the stage was extended by a few laps to give a new distance of  overall. Edvald Boasson Hagen was strongly positioned in the final lap, pulled forward by his team, but in the final sprint he was passed by several riders and received fourth in the stage. Dutch rider Theo Bos took first, followed closely by Alexander Kristoff, who retained his position as first place in sprinting and overall, and Italian rider Matteo Pelucchi, who took third. Sven Erik Bystrøm took the young riders classification from fellow countryman Sondre Holst Enger, while Sander Cordeel held on to his title as King of the Mountains.

Stage 4
18 May 2013 – Brumunddal to Lillehammer, 

Edvald Boasson Hagen was considered to have a home advantage since he was raised in Rudsbygd near Lillehammer and had done the climbs there many times. Boasson Hagen was part of a group that split early on and maintained their lead throughout the race, with the yellow-jerseyed Alexander Kristoff among the peloton left behind. On the final climb of the ride, with about  remaining, Portuguese rider Sérgio Paulinho made a break from the group, and Boasson Hagen caught up with him before the summit. The two men worked together to maintain their lead until the final lap, when Boasson Hagen broke away from Paulinho and secured a decisive victory, taking the lead from Alexander Kristoff in both the sprint and overall classifications. Paulinho came second and Dutch rider Bauke Mollema took third. Sondre Holst Enger came fourth and retook the young rider classification from Sven Erik Bystrøm, and Sander Cordeel maintained his King of the Mountains title for the third stage in a row.

Stage 5
19 May 2013 – Gjøvik to Hønefoss, 

The fifth and final stage was a race south from Gjøvik ending with four long and hilly circuits in Hønefoss. Alexander Kristoff came in first and received his third stage win of the competition. Next came Team Plussbank rider Sondre Holst Enger, who retained the top spot in the young riders classification and placed third overall, and then Edvald Boasson Hagen in third, securing a sprint classification and general classification victory for the second consecutive year in the Tour of Norway. Sérgio Paulinho came in second overall and Sander Cordeel took the King of Mountains title.

Classification leadership table

Final standings

General classification

Sprint classification

Mountains classification

Young riders classification

Team classification

References

2013 UCI Europe Tour
2013 in Norwegian sport
Tour of Norway